On September 21, 2007, two 17-year-old Delaware State University freshmen were shot on campus. One died 32 days later on October 23, from critical injuries sustained in the attack. A suspected perpetrator, Loyer D. Braden, a freshman from East Orange, New Jersey, was arrested and charged with attempted murder; the charges were dismissed in May 2009.

Events and university response
On September 21, 2007, a perpetrator shot two 17-year-old Delaware State University students from the Washington, D.C. area, Shalita Middleton and Nathaniel Pugh, and shot at but did not wound a third student. Middleton died on October 23 from injuries sustained in the attack, without regaining consciousness.

The university responded within 20 minutes of the shooting to notify students by web announcements, physically entering dorms, and telecommunications.  Text messages were not sent at the time of the incident. The campus was kept on "limited access status" from Friday, September 21 through Sunday, September 23, with classes resuming on Monday, September 24. The university increased security patrols on campus following the incident.

Arrest
On September 24, 2007, police arrested Loyer D. Braden, also a freshman, in his dorm and charged him with attempted first-degree murder among other offences.
I question the young man's intelligence in coming back to campus this morning, if that's what he did. Lord knows what was going through his brain. Maybe he thought he was scott-free.—Carlos Holmes, university spokesman. 

On September 28, 2007, following Braden's arraignment hearing, the case was transferred to Superior Court for trial.  The judge ordered that if Braden made bail, he be barred from visiting the DESU campus or contacting potential witnesses.

On May 19, 2009, the judge dismissed the charges against Braden, saying that the prosecution had withheld evidence. A witness who had been with Middleton said that two men in dreadlocks and white t-shirts had shot the students.

References

External links

Delaware State University
University and college shootings in the United States
Murder in Delaware
2007 murders in the United States
2007 in Delaware
School killings in the United States
Deaths by firearm in Delaware
Crimes in Delaware
September 2007 events in the United States